ESWAT: City Under Siege, released in Japan as , is a 1990 side scrolling action platform video game developed and published by Sega for the Sega Genesis and Sega Master System video game consoles.

City Under Siege was based on the arcade game Cyber Police ESWAT released a year earlier in 1989. The console game maintains the main characters, plot and some of its enemies from the arcade game, but features some different levels, weapons, and bonuses.

Backbone Entertainment pitched a new ESWAT game to Sega, but the project was never greenlit. Artwork and screenshots of the game were later leaked.

Description
The game is a sidescrolling platformer similar to Shinobi. It is set in the near future, where the player controls a blonde haired police officer named  who, over a series of levels, before receiving an armored power suit. At first, as a rookie member of the Cyber Police force in the city of Liberty, the player has to clean the streets of an overwhelming crime wave and terminate the most wanted criminals. In the first and second levels of the game, the completely human Duke can only utilize a single shot weapon and can only survive one hit. A second hit will kill him.

A mysterious and high-tech terrorist organization, named "E.Y.E.", quickly threatens to take over the entire city and, after being promoted at the end of the second level, Duke is given power armor called the "ICE Combat Suit". With this suit the player can use new and more lethal weapons; "Super Shot", a plasma rifle, rockets, and a devastating fire attack if he finds them. The player also has access to a jet pack with limited fuel that replenishes over time. Finally, this armor will allow the player to take more damage before being defeated. Unfortunately, because the suit makes him larger, it is harder for him to dodge enemy attacks. The final boss of the game, the leader of E.Y.E., is revealed to be a robot with artificial intelligence that is attempting to replicate its own ICE Combat Suits to take over Liberty.

Reception

Raze magazine gave an overall review score of 72% praising the variety of detailed backgrounds, voice recordings and described the gameplay saying: "Initially interesting and compelling". They criticized the game being too easy and repetitive. Mega Action gave a review score of 81% writing: "The graphics are looking dated but the gameplay has stood the test of time." Console XS gave a review score of 84/100 saying the game is "very challenging and addictive." MegaTech praised Eswat calling it "A super slick shoot-‘em-up that simply oozes quality". They praised the parallex scrolling backgrounds, sprites and sound and described the gameplay as "challenging and highly addictive".

In 1992 Mega placed the game at #32 in their Top Mega Drive Games of All Time.

Ports
The Sega Master System port was released around the same time as the Genesis version in 1990.  As the Genesis was now becoming a major contender in the US market, ESWAT was one of the last major ports to the Master System as it neared the end of its generational life cycle.  Like other arcade ports such as Shinobi, ESWAT featured a "health meter" that would allow the player to take several hits before losing a life, instead of simply one or two.  The Genesis version was more faithful to the arcade in graphics and gameplay.

A Virtual Console version for the Wii was released in August 2007 in Japan and in the PAL regions on September 7, 2007.

The game also appeared in Sonic's Ultimate Genesis Collection, also known as the Sega Mega Drive Ultimate Collection in Europe and Australia, for Xbox 360 and PlayStation 3.

References

External links
Official Virtual Console website 
ESWAT Mega Drive/Genesis review  (Wayback Machine mirror) from Mean Machines Archive

1990 video games
Cyberpunk video games
Sega Genesis games
Sega video games
Virtual Console games
Sanritsu Denki games
Video games about police officers
Video games scored by Takayuki Nakamura
Video games developed in Japan